Bettina is a chamber opera with music by Friedrich Schenker to a libretto by Karl Mickel. The topic is the writer Bettina von Arnim and her relationship with Karoline von Günderrode. The work is described as an "opera for one actress (mezzo-soprano), children's choir, tape and ensemble".

History 
Bettina is a chamber opera with music by Friedrich Schenker. The libretto by Karl Mickel deals with the relationship between Bettina von Arnim and Karoline von Günderrode, based on Goethe's Briefwechsel mit einem Kinde, an epistolary novel by Arnim, published in Berlin in 1835. The work is described as an "opera for one actress (mezzo-soprano), children's choir, tape and ensemble". It was recorded with the premiere performers. The duration is about 80 minutes.

It was published by Breitkopf & Härtel.

Plot 
The relationship between Bettina von Arnim and Karoline von Günderrode is viewed in retrospect, after Günderrode's suicide. The only singer, a mezzo-soprano, takes both roles, in both taped and actual music. A children's choir acts as in Greek tragedy, sometimes commenting, sometimes interacting.

Music 
According to a reviewer, Schenker depicts the two women as developed and contradictory characters: "they are divided internally, on the path to emotional and intellectual emancipation. Strength and weakness, chaos and clarity lie harshly side by side in the music". Günderrode is represented by a waltz theme, while the music for Arnim turns to march rhythms when she decides to suppress femininity in order to survive, "Hart muss ich werden wie Stahl" (I must become hard like steel).

References

External links 

 Goethe's correspondence with a child (English translation of Goethes Briefwechsel mit einem Kinde, 1835 hedweb.coma-goethe.html

Chamber operas
1987 operas
German-language operas
Operas
Monodrama
Operas based on novels
Operas based on real people